The 1968–69 season was the 70th season for FC Barcelona.

Results

References

External links

webdelcule.com 

FC Barcelona seasons
Barcelona